Chantal Grimard (born 9 September 1959) is a Belgian former butterfly and freestyle swimmer. She competed in four events at the 1976 Summer Olympics.

References

External links
 

1959 births
Living people
Belgian female butterfly swimmers
Belgian female freestyle swimmers
Olympic swimmers of Belgium
Swimmers at the 1976 Summer Olympics
Sportspeople from Liège
20th-century Belgian women